Time and Again may refer to:

Literature
 Time and Again (Finney novel), a novel by Jack Finney
 "Time and Again" (short story), a 1977 short story by Breece D'J Pancake
 Time and Again, a Korean series by JiUn Yun, serialized in Yen Plus
 Time and Again (Simak novel), a novel by Clifford D. Simak

Other media
 Time and Again (TV series), an American retrospective series
 "Time and Again" (Star Trek: Voyager), an episode of the TV series Star Trek: Voyager
 "Time and Again" (Ms. Marvel), a 2022 episode of the TV series Ms. Marvel
 Time and Again, a board game containing time travel
 "Time and Again", a song by a-ha from Lifelines
 Time and Again (Mulgrew Miller album), 1991

See also
 Time Again (disambiguation)
 Time and Time Again (disambiguation)